Robert Blinc (October 30, 1933 – September 26, 2011) was a prominent Slovene physicist a full professor of physics and, with more than 650 articles in prestigious international journals and two extensive monographs published abroad, a highly regarded and quoted researcher in condensed matter physics.

More than 14,000 citations of his works, longer and shorter visits to renowned foreign universities, a number of invited lectures at international conferences, work in international professional organizations and partnerships in a number of international projects also show his strong reputation at the global level. With his exceptional achievements and diversified activity, Professor Blinc substantiated the experimental physics of condensed matter in Slovenia, and with his strong commitment to international openness he certainly made a key contribution to the international recognition of the entire physics of Ljubljana. As an excellent university teacher, he also educated a large number of Slovenian physicists.

He completed his undergraduate studies in 1958 at the Faculty of Natural Sciences in Ljubljana and received a PhD a year later. He then started post-doc study at the Massachusetts Institute of Technology. When he returned to Slovenia, he continued his work at the Jožef Stefan Institute as a long-time head of the Department for Condensed Matter Physics. He became a professor at the University of Ljubljana in 1970. He was the first Dean of Jožef Stefan International Postgraduate School in Ljubljana since 2004.

Robert Blinc has been a visiting professor at many international universities, winner of numerous international awards, a member of various associations and editorial boards of international professional journals. In 1991 he became the Ambassador of the Republic of Slovenia in Science, and in 2000 the Institute for Scientific Information (ISI) awarded Professor Blinc the award for the Slovenian scientist with the most citations during the 25-year existence of ISI. In 2001, together with his colleagues, he received the state award for patents and inventions of the Republic of Slovenia. He was a member of the Slovenian Academy of Sciences and Arts and served as its vice president from October 2, 1980, to May 6, 1999. He was also a member of the European Academy of Sciences and Arts and an honorary member of the Society of Mathematicians, Physicists and Astronomers of Slovenia.  He died in Ljubljana, Slovenia.

Scientific career 
Professor Blinc was one of the founders of uses of nuclear magnetic resonance for  investigations of phase transitions and liquid crystals. Shortly after graduating, Blinc established a nuclear magnetic resonance (NMR) laboratory with a few young colleagues(his first paper on the subject was published in early 1958) and was the head of the Condensed Matter Physics Department at the Jožef Stefan Institute., which became one of the most important European and global centers for research into structural transitions in regulated and partially regulated condensed matter. He is the founder of the so-called Ljubljana School of Magnetic Resonance Imaging. Immediately after his employment, he published findings on the disharmony of the hydrogen bond. Among his most important scientific achievements is the model of ferroelectrics with hydrogen bonds, which some authors refer to in the literature as the Blinc-de Gennes model. The Blinc-Pincus spin network relaxation mechanism of nematic liquid crystals due to collective fluctuations of nematic order parameters is also known. Among other important achievements, special mention should be made of the detection of solitons and shapes in incommensurable crystals by nuclear magnetic resonance and the introduction of NMR methods to determine the Edwards-Anderson parameter of the glassy order in proton and deuteron glasses and relaxors. This parameter was previously considered not to be a directly measurable quantity. The result of his work is also a series of new spectroscopic methods, which, among other things, enabled the determination of the structure of amino acids and nucleic acids, as well as the cultivation of new plant species with better nutritional properties and rapid characterization of building materials. Together with Boštjan Žekš, he was the first to predict the existence of the Goldstone mode of oscillation in ferroelectric liquid crystals. He and co-workers introduced the Ising model to describe proton and deuteron glasses.

Teaching and educational legacy  
Robert Blinc lectured key subjects at the undergraduate and postgraduate level at the Department of Physics of the Faculty of Science and before that at the Faculty of Physics and Mathematics of the University of Ljubljana, in later years at the Jožef Stefan International Postgraduate School. He has mentored 35 doctoral students, 25 undergraduates and 67 graduates.

Professional memberships and teaching experience 

 professor for solid state physics, Faculty of Natural sciences and Technology, U. Ljubljana
 president of Societe AMPERE (European Society of Magnetic Resonance), 1986-1994
 European Steering Committee on Ferroelectricity, 1986-1999
 Committee for Sustainable Development, Slovenian Academy of Sciences and Arts, 1999 on
 International Atomic  Energy Commission (IAEA) expert in Brasil, Cuba and Thailand
 Visiting professor, University of Washington, Seattle, Washington, USA, Universidade Federal de Minas Gerais, Belo Horizonte, Brasil, ETH Zürich, University of Vienna
 Adjunct Professor, University of Utah, Salt Lake City, Utah, USA

Prizes 
 ISMAR Prize of the  International Society of magnetic Resonance, 1977
 Kidrič Prize for  Physics, 1961 and 1975
 AVNOJ Prize, 1978
 Ambasador of Science of the Republic of Slovenia prize, 1991
 Golden Liberty Medal of the Republic of Slovenia, 2002
 Nuclear Hyperfine Interaction Award 2004 from the International Society of Nuclear Quadrupole Resonance

Honours 
 Doctor Honoris Causa, University of Ljubljana, 2003
 Doctor Honoris Causa,  University of Bucharest, 1999
  Member of Slovenian Academy of Sciences and Arts, Member of Academia Scientiarum et Artium Europaea (Salzburg) and Academia Europaea (London)
 Foreign corresponding member of Croatian Academy of Sciences, Polish Academy of Sciences, Saxonian Academy of Sciences (Leipzig), Greek Academy of Sciences (Athens), International Academy of Engineering (Moscow)
 Member of advisory editorial boards of Ferroelectrics, Phase transitions, Molecular Crystals and Liquid Crystals, Ferroelectric Letters, Bulletin of Magnetic resonance, PHYSICA, Section B, Chemical Physics, Solid State Nuclear magnetic resonance, Molecular Physics Reports

Major research achievements 
 Development of NMR techniques for the determination of local properties of ferroelectrics, incommensurate and glassy transitions
 Development of the  tunneling model of hydrogene bonded ferroelectrics (Blinc-de Gennes  model)
 Discovery of solitons and phasons in incommensurate systems
 Discovery of relaxation via nematic order fluctuations in liquid crystals (Pincus-Blinc model)
 Prediction of the phason Goldstone mode in helicoidal ferroelectric liquid crystals and  first theory of unwound ferroelectric liquid crystals
 Development of a NMR technique for the measurement of the Edwards-Anderson order parameter in  proton and deuteron glasses
 Development of the random bond-random field Ising model of deuteron glasses
 Development of the spherical random bond-random field model of relaxors
 Determination of the origin of ferromagnetism in the purely organic ferroemagnet TDAE-C60

Publications 
 More than 700 publications in international journals, among them 43 Phys. Rev.Letters, 4 in Nature and Science
 more than 14,000 citations in SCI
 110 invited lectures at major international conferences
 Soft Modes in  Ferroelectrics and Antiferreoelectrics, North-Holland, 1974;  Russian translation: Segnetoelektriki i Antisegnetoelektriki – Dinamika Rešetki,MIR, Moscow 1975; Chinese translation, 1982 (together with B. Žekš)
 The Physics of Ferroelectric and  Antiferroelectric Liquid Crystals, World Scientific,2000,  (together with I. Muševič and B. Žekš)
 Editor and co-author of eight other monographies

References 

1933 births
2011 deaths
Scientists from Ljubljana
Slovenian physicists
Massachusetts Institute of Technology alumni
Members of the European Academy of Sciences and Arts
Academic staff of the University of Ljubljana
Members of the Slovenian Academy of Sciences and Arts
University of Ljubljana alumni